Road 38 is a road connecting Tehran to Buin Zahra and Hamedan Road.

References

External links 

 Iran road map on Young Journalists Club

Roads in Iran
Transport in Tehran
Transportation in Tehran Province
Transportation in Qazvin Province